Fangatau Airport  is an airport serving the village of Teana, located on the Fangatau atoll, in the Tuamotu group of atolls in French Polynesia,  from Tahiti.

Fangatau Airport was inaugurated in 1978.

Airlines and destinations

References

External links
 Atoll list (in French)
 Classification of the French Polynesian atolls by Salvat (1985)

Airports in French Polynesia
Atolls of the Tuamotus